is an indoor sporting arena located in Sendai, Miyagi, Japan.  The capacity of the arena is 7,000.  It hosted preliminary round games for the Basketball World Championship 2006, and is also the home arena of the Sendai 89ers of the Japan professional basketball B.League. In 1994 and 2004, it hosted the Asian Basketball Championship for Women.

The gymnasium is also the site of international volleyball competitions, and in 2006 hosted the opening rounds of the Thomas Cup and Uber Cup international team badminton tournaments.

Access
Sendai Gymnasium is located near Tomizawa Station of the Sendai Subway Nanboku Line.

Gallery

External links
Sendai Gymnasium promotional site for international events
Kamei Arena Sendai on Twitter

Indoor arenas in Japan
Basketball venues in Japan
Sports venues in Sendai
Boxing venues in Japan
Sports venues completed in 1984
Sendai 89ers
1984 establishments in Japan